Denis Lidjan (born 24 September 1993) is a Slovenian footballer who plays for Radomlje.

References

External links
PrvaLiga profile 

1993 births
Living people
Footballers from Ljubljana
Slovenian footballers
Association football defenders
NK Olimpija Ljubljana (2005) players
NK Triglav Kranj players
NK Radomlje players
Slovenian Second League players
Slovenian PrvaLiga players
Slovenia youth international footballers